Darius Johnson (born 15 March 2000) is an English professional footballer who plays as a forward for Volendam.

Career
As a youngster, Johnson had various internships and trials with football clubs, firstly with Queens Park Rangers before heading off to the likes of Tottenham Hotspur, Crawley Town and Oxford United, but failed to secure permanent terms. After a subsequent break from football, Johnson returned at the age of seventeen to play for The Harrow Club at youth level. During his time with them, Johnson played in a friendly against YouTube team Rising Ballers; who subsequently signed the forward. He would eventually leave the club, prior to joining Combined Counties Football League side Kensington & Ealing Borough.

After making five appearances for the semi-professional outfit, Johnson joined Chelsea on trial. He earned the possibility of a contract after featuring in Premier League 2 against Brighton & Hove Albion, but was unable to sign due to Chelsea's ongoing transfer ban. Johnson secured a trial with Dutch team FC Volendam in mid-2019. He was given a professional deal soon after, having appeared in an exhibition match versus VPV Purmersteijn. He made his pro debut on 23 August 2019 during a 3–0 loss away to De Graafschap, as he came off the bench to replace Nick Doodeman after seventy-nine minutes.

Johnson scored his first FC Volendam league goal on 13 September, netting in a home draw against FC Dordrecht.

His contract with Volendam ended in the summer of 2022 but he reappeared for the club's second team in October 2022 playing in the Tweede Divisie.

Career statistics
.

References

2000 births
Living people
Footballers from Chelsea, London
Black British sportspeople
English footballers
Association football forwards
English expatriate footballers
Expatriate footballers in the Netherlands
English expatriate sportspeople in the Netherlands
Combined Counties Football League players
Eerste Divisie players
Tweede Divisie players
Kensington & Ealing Borough F.C. players
FC Volendam players